Thomas McDonnell (c. 1831–1899) was a military leader in colonial New Zealand.

Thomas McDonnell or McDonell may also refer to:

 Thomas McDonnell Sr. (1788–1864), trader and diplomat in colonial New Zealand
 Thomas John McDonnell (1894–1961), Roman Catholic bishop in the United States
 Thomas McDonnell (bishop) (1912–1987), Roman Catholic bishop in Ireland
 Thomas McDonell (born 1986), actor, musician and artist in the United States

See also
 Thomas Macdonnell, pseudonym used by James Fitz Edmond Cotter (c.1630–1705), Irish soldier and colonial governor